Ceratitis aliena is a species of in insect in the family Tephritidae. This is a genus of Tephritid or fruit flies.

References 

Dacinae
Agricultural pest insects